Rajendra Bhalekar (17 February 1952 – 14 April 2018) was an Indian cricketer. He played 74 first-class matches between 1972 and 1986 and was the captain of the Maharashtra cricket team.

See also
 List of Maharashtra cricketers

References

External links
 

1952 births
2018 deaths
Indian cricketers
Maharashtra cricketers
West Zone cricketers
Cricketers from Pune